The Nun's Island gas station was a modernist-style filling station in Montreal built in 1969 from a project of Ludwig Mies van der Rohe. Closed for several years, it was later converted to a community centre.

It was the first gas station on the island, commissioned by Imperial Oil.

Community centre

The borough of Verdun transformed the building into a community arts centre, La Station. Eric Gauthier was the lead architect on the project, which saw the two glass pavilions rebuilt to their original 3,000- and  sizes.

La Station is a community centre for teens and people over 50 years of age. The two main buildings are called  the salle blanche (English: white room) and salle noire (English: black room), after their floor colours. The original glass-enclosed attendant's booth serves as a display case of Mies' and the building's history, with the former fuel dispensers marked by ventilation shafts. The centre uses geothermal energy.

See also
Westmount Square

References

External links

 
  Montreal Architects Rescue Mies Van Der Rohe Gas Station from Obscurity, The Architizer Blog
 Conversion of Mies van der Rohe gas station on Nuns Island, e-architect.co.uk, Feb 21, 2012, updated March 6, 2014

Commercial buildings completed in 1969
Buildings and structures in Montreal
ExxonMobil buildings and structures
Gas stations in Canada
Heritage buildings of Quebec
Historic filling stations
Ludwig Mies van der Rohe buildings
Modernist architecture in Canada
Verdun, Quebec
1969 establishments in Quebec
Community centres in Canada